A vacation or holiday is a recreational trip or a leave of absence from work.

Vacation may also refer to:

Film and television
National Lampoon's Vacation, a 1983 comedy film starring Chevy Chase
National Lampoon's Vacation (film series), a franchise based on the 1983 film
Vacation (2015 film), a continuation of the Vacation series
Vacations (film), a 1947 Argentine film
Vacation (2005 film), an Indian Malayalam-language film
Vacation, a 2011 film starring Dean Cain
 Vacation (2022 film), a South Korean film
"Vacation" (The Golden Girls), a 1986 television episode
"The Vacation" (Chowder), a 2008 television episode

Music

Albums
Vacation (Big Scary album), 2011
Vacation (Bomb the Music Industry! album), 2011
Vacation (The Go-Go's album) or the title song (see below), 1982
Vacation (Seaway album), 2017
Vacation, by Frenship, 2019
Vacation, by Paces, 2016

Songs
"Vacation" (Alphabeat song), 2012
"Vacation" (Connie Francis song), 1962
"Vacation" (G.R.L. song), 2013
"Vacation" (The Go-Go's song), 1982
"Vacation" (Thomas Rhett song), 2016
"Vacation" (Young Jeezy song), 2008
"Vacation", by Dirty Heads from Swim Team, 2017
"Vacation", by Superfruit from Future Friends, 2017
"Vacation", by Takeoff from The Last Rocket, 2018
"Vacation", by Tyga, 2020
"The Vacation Song", by Shane Dawson, 2012

Other uses
Vacation (novel), a 2007 novel by Jeremy C. Shipp
The Sims: Vacation, a 2002 expansion for the video game The Sims

See also
 
 
 Holiday (disambiguation)
 Permanent Vacation (disambiguation)
 Annual leave, time granted off from work
 School holiday, a period during which schools are closed
 Spring break, a recess from studying in some countries
 Street vacation, a type of easement
 Summer vacation, a school holiday
 Tourism, travel for pleasure or business
 Vacated judgment, the act of overturning a court ruling